LOA may stand for:

Music
Life of Agony, a New York hardcore/hard rock band
Lights Out Asia, a Milwaukee, Wisconsin-based post-rock and ambient band
Lords of Acid, a Belgian-American post-industrial/techno band
"Love on Arrival," a song by country music singer Dan Seals

Other
 Lake Oconee Academy, Georgia
 Law of attraction, a belief of New Thought movement
 Leave of absence, a period of time that one must be away from his/her primary job, while maintaining the status of employee.
 Level of assurance
 Length overall, the maximum length of a vessel's hull measured parallel to the waterline. 
 Letter of Agency (also Letter of Authorization), a document authorizing a telecommunications provider to act on a consumer's behalf
 Letter of Authority, a legal document in South Africa for vehicle registration
 Library of America, an American publisher
 Library Oriented Architecture, a software engineering methodology 
 Lines of Action, an abstract-strategy game
 Left occipito-anterior, a cephalic presentation in childbirth
 Low-opioid anesthesia, a variant of, general anesthesia
 Limits of Agreement, a statistical measure used when comparing the degree of agreement among raters

See also
 Loa (disambiguation)